Prunus turfosa is a species of plant in the family Rosaceae, found in; Kalimantan, Indonesia; Sarawak, Malaysia; and possibly Brunei. The plant is restricted to peat swamp forests. As of 1998, the plant was categorised as Endangered by the IUCN on their "Red List" due to licensing of peat swamp forests of Sarawak to be logged.

References

turfosa
Endangered plants
Taxonomy articles created by Polbot
Flora of Borneo